Torne Valley Sub-region is a subdivision of Finnish Lapland and one of the Sub-regions of Finland. The sub-region should not be confused with Torne Valley (Meänmaa).

Municipalities
 Pello
 Ylitornio

Politics
Results of the 2018 Finnish presidential election:

 Sauli Niinistö   47.2%
 Paavo Väyrynen   20.4%
 Matti Vanhanen   11.7%
 Merja Kyllönen   7.7%
 Pekka Haavisto   5.8%
 Laura Huhtasaari   4.5%
 Tuula Haatainen   2.4%
 Nils Torvalds   0.2%

Sub-regions of Finland
Lapland (Finland)